Admiral Sir Edmund Samuel Poë  (11 September 1849 – 1 April 1921) was a Royal Navy officer who went on to be Commander-in-Chief, East Indies station.

Naval career
Educated at the Burney's Royal Naval Academy, Gosport, Poë joined the Royal Navy in 1862.

He was made Naval Advisor to the Inspector-General of Fortifications in 1889 and Commander of the Training Squadron in 1897. 
Promoted to Commodore 2nd Class by 1899 he commanded the Cruiser Squadron until 1900. In September 1901 he was promoted to Rear-Admiral. He went on to be Second in command of the Home Fleet in 1903 and Rear-Admiral Commanding 1st Cruiser Squadron in 1904. He was appointed Commander-in-Chief, East Indies Station in 1905, Commander-in-Chief, Cape of Good Hope Station in 1907 and Commander-in-Chief, Mediterranean Fleet in 1910. Finally was appointed First and Principal Aide-de-Camp to the King in 1912 and retired in 1914.

Family
In 1877 he married Frances Catherine Sheil.

References

|-

|-

|-

1849 births
1921 deaths
Royal Navy admirals
Knights Grand Cross of the Royal Victorian Order
Knights Commander of the Order of the Bath